Raffaello Fagnoni (29 April 1901 – 4 May 1966) was an Italian architect. His work was part of the architecture event in the art competition at the 1936 Summer Olympics.

References

1901 births
1966 deaths
20th-century Italian architects
Olympic competitors in art competitions
Architects from Florence